Michael Thangadurai (born 23 August 1983) is an Indian actor and dancer. He made his acting debut in the  youth based soap opera Kana Kaanum Kaalangal in Star Vijay. He was the winner of the reality dance show Jodi Number One in Season 4 along with Hemalatha. He acted in the film  Kanimozhi and later a got a breakthrough with the male lead role in the film Nalanum Nandhiniyum. He shot for a film  Pathungi Paayanum Thala, which is yet to release.

Filmography
Films

Television

References

1983 births
Living people
Tamil male actors
Tamil male television actors
Television personalities from Tamil Nadu
Male actors from Tamil Nadu
Male actors in Tamil cinema
21st-century Tamil male actors
Tamil Reality dancing competition contestants
Reality show winners
People from Coimbatore